Yuga Yugagale Saagali is a 2008 Indian Kannada-language romantic drama film directed by Shashank Raj and starring debutantes Yashas and Megha Ghosh.

Cast 
Yashas as Shashi 
Megha Ghosh as Swati 
Rangayana Raghu
Anant Nag as Sashi's father
Sharath Lohitashwa as Narasimha
Vasanth Kumar
Sangeetha
Padmaja Rao

Soundtrack 
Music composed by Hamsalekha.
"Aadanga Bari" - Vijay Yesudas

Reception 
A critic from The Times of India rated the film 2.5 out of 5 and wrote that "The acting talent of Rangayana Raghu and Anant Nag is sadly wasted with a weak script". RG Vijasarathy of Rediff.com gave the film the same rating and wrote that "While the story has nothing new to offer, the film scores because of the picturisation of songs, which are pretty good and tight screenplay in the second half". A critic from MyMazaa opined that "This is a love and revenge saga we have seen number of times on silver screen. The debutant director Shashankraj fails to impress with such a wafer thin storyline". A critic from Nowrunning rated the film 3 out of 5 and said that "Yuga Yugagale Saagali is a neatly narrated film which can be watched without any inhibitions by the family audience".

References